Sir George Hopwood Hume (24 May 1866 – 13 September 1946) was a British Conservative politician and leader of the London County Council.

He was born in the Ukrainian city of Poltava, then in the Russian Empire. His father was George Hume, a Scottish mechanical engineer, and British vice consul at Kiev and Kharkov. He was educated in Russia, Switzerland and at the Finsbury Technical College, London. He was apprenticed as an electrical engineer at Siemens Brothers, later studying law and was called to the bar at the Middle Temple in 1900. In 1901, he married Jeanne Alice Ladrierre of Lausanne, who died in 1922.

Political career

Greenwich Borough Council
Hume entered politics in November 1900 when he was elected to the newly constituted Greenwich Borough Council as a member of the Conservative-backed Moderate grouping. He topped the poll in the Charlton ward, and became leader as the Moderates took control of the new council.

London County Council
In March 1910 Hume was elected to the London County Council to represent Greenwich. He was a member of the majority Municipal Reform Party, the title used by the Conservatives, on the county council. He was re-elected in 1913, and was appointed chairman of the Highways Committee. In this capacity in May 1914 he presided over a ceremony to commission new turbines at the Greenwich Power Station of the London County Council Tramways.

Leader of the council
In 1918 Hume succeeded Ronald Collet Norman as leader of the Municipal Reformers and thus the council. Although the party had a majority of seats, they had formed a wartime coalition with the opposition Progressives. Hume, who was re-elected in 1919,  continued this agreement until 1922. Hume was elevated to the rank of county alderman in 1922 which he was to hold until his death. In 1924 he was knighted. In 1925 he resigned as council leader, and in 1926 was elected to the ceremonial post of Chairman of the L.C.C.

Member of Parliament for Greenwich
In 1922, Hume was nominated as Conservative candidate for the parliamentary constituency of Greenwich. He was elected by a large majority over his Labour Party opponent, Edward Palmer. A further election was held in 1923, and Palmer unseated Hume. Hume unseated Palmer at the 1924 election, only for the situation to be reversed in 1929. In 1931, Hume regained the seat, with Palmer's vote reduced by the presence of a Communist candidate, and was re-elected four years later.

Apart from his municipal and parliamentary offices, Hume was a member of the London and Home Counties Traffic Advisory Committee, the Thames Conservancy Board and the London and Home Counties Joint Electricity Authority.

In 1932, he married Dorothy Hunt Blundell. In 1938, he indicated his intention to stand down at the next election. In the event, elections were postponed due to the Second World War, and he remained in the Commons until 1945.

Death
Sir George Hume died at his home at Blackheath, London in September 1946, aged 80.

References

External links 
 

1866 births
1946 deaths
Members of London County Council
Conservative Party (UK) MPs for English constituencies
UK MPs 1922–1923
UK MPs 1924–1929
UK MPs 1931–1935
UK MPs 1935–1945
Anglo-Scots
Municipal Reform Party politicians
Members of Greenwich Metropolitan Borough Council
Knights Bachelor